National Secondary Route 242, or just Route 242 (or ) is a National Road Route of Costa Rica, located in the San José province.

Description
In San José province the route covers Pérez Zeledón canton (San Isidro de El General, Daniel Flores, Rivas districts).

References

Highways in Costa Rica